Salvinia molesta, commonly known as giant salvinia, or as kariba weed after it infested a large portion of Lake Kariba between Zimbabwe and Zambia, is an aquatic fern, native to south-eastern Brazil. It is a free-floating plant that does not attach to the soil, but instead remains buoyant on the surface of a body of water. The fronds are 0.5–4 cm long and broad, with a bristly surface caused by the hair-like strands that join at the end to form eggbeater shapes. They are used to provide a waterproof covering. These fronds are produced in pairs also with a third modified root-like frond that hangs in the water. It has been accidentally introduced or escaped to countless lakes throughout the United States, including Caddo Lake in Texas, where the invasive species has done extensive damage, killing off other life.

In Europe, Salvinia molesta has been included since 2019 in the list of Invasive Alien Species of Union concern (the Union list). This implies that this species cannot be imported, cultivated, transported, commercialized, planted, or intentionally released into the environment in the whole of the European Union.

Description
Salvinia molesta is a complex of closely related floating ferns; they can be difficult to distinguish from each other. This water fern is often grown as an ornamental plant but has escaped and become a noxious pest in many regions worldwide. There are a few different growth forms for S. molesta. The primary growth form is an invading form with small flat leaves to the tertiary or mat form with large, crowded, folded leaves. Under the best conditions plants can form a two-foot-thick mat. These mats can put a halt to recreational activities on lakes and waterways. S. molesta has been used to extract nutrients and pollutants from the water. When this plant is dried out, it is used as satisfactory mulch.

Favored environmental conditions 
Salvinia molesta prefers to grow in slow-moving waters such as those found in lakes, ponds, billabongs (oxbows), streams, ditches, marshes, and rivers. It prefers nutrient-rich waters such as those found in eutrophic water or those polluted by waste water. It does not usually grow in brackish or salty waters, but has been reported in streams with a tidal flow in southeast Texas. It copes well with dewatering, and while it prefers to grow in moderate temperatures, it will tolerate low or very high temperatures. The United States Geological Service believes that it could grow in zones 7a, 8, 9, and 10 of the USDA Plant Hardiness Map.

Effects of environmental conditions
Environmental conditions can have a strong effect on this plant. S. molesta can survive on a mud bank for a short period of time, but because of the dry conditions, it cannot live there permanently. It grows best at a pH of 6–7.7 and at a water temperature of 20–30 °C. Growth can be increased in high light intensities. S. molesta cannot grow in high salt concentrations; the increase in salt causes a decrease in chlorophyll.

Methods of introduction 
The plant originated in southeast Brazil and was exported as part of the pet industry to be used in aquaria and garden ponds. From there, it escaped or was deliberately released into the wild. It may also have been brought in with fresh, iced fish. Once in a waterway, it can be spread by infested boats, which not only spread it to new areas, but also break up the plant, allowing it to propagate. It also is spread by waterfowl. S. molesta has been spread by contaminated aquatic plant stocks, boats, and other watercraft. The movement of water spreads S. molesta, and the sale and exchange of S. molesta materials increases chances of release to the environment.

Potential use for cleaning water pollution 
Research done in the Philippines suggested the effectiveness of S. molesta for the treatment of blackwater effluent for an eco-friendly sewage system that uses a constructed wetland to clean the water. The result of the study showed that it can remove 30.77% of total suspended solids, 74.70% dissolved oxygen and 48.95% fecal coliform from the water.

Distribution
The Brazilian floating fern known as Salvinia molesta is now widely distributed in tropical and subtropical areas. This floating fern is known for its capability to take over large bodies of slow-moving fresh water.  S. molesta has been naturalized in Texas and Louisiana, but has now also been found and reported in Alabama, Mississippi, Florida, and Georgia. It can also be found where the lower Colorado River borders Arizona and California.  "While S. molesta rapidly colonizes new states, current populations are too small to assess, but have been targeted for eradication". The naturalized regions of Texas have 14 drainage basins that contain infested water bodies; these are used as impoundments on tributaries that flow near federally protected wetlands. In October 2020 Texas Parks and Wildlife detected S. molesta on Lone Star Lake while surveying fish populations.

Reproduction 
It reproduces by asexual reproduction only, but it is capable of growing extremely quickly, starting from small fragments and doubling in dry weight every 2.2–2.5 days. It grows from fragments that have broken off or dormant buds that have been detached from the main plant. Each node has five buds, so potential for great and rapid spread is high. It also produces spores, but they are genetically defective and do not produce viable offspring.

Effect 
The rapid growth rate of Salvinia molesta has resulted in its classification as an invasive weed in some parts of the world such as Australia, United Kingdom, New Zealand, and parts of the United States. Surfaces of ponds, reservoirs, and lakes are covered by a floating mat 10–20 cm (in some rare cases up to 60 cm) thick. The plant's growth clogs waterways and blocks sunlight needed by other aquatic plants and especially algae to carry out photosynthesis, thereby deoxygenating the water. As it dies and decays, decomposers use up the oxygen in the water. It also prevents the natural exchange of gases between the air and the body of water the plant has invaded, causing the waterway to stagnate. This can kill any plants, insects, or fish trapped underneath its growth. 

Its ability to grow and cover a vast area makes it a threat to biodiversity. Large infestations covering a wide area may also pose a problem to migratory birds, as they may not be able to recognise an infested waterway when flying overhead, so may not stop at it. S. molesta  provides ideal conditions for the breeding of mosquitoes that carry disease. The growth habit of Salvinia is problematic to human activities including flood mitigation, conservation of endangered species and threatened environments, boating, and irrigation.

Cancer research
Researchers at Stephen F. Austin State University in Nacogdoches, Texas discovered that extracts of giant salvinia have shown promising signs of inhibiting growth of human cancer cells without destroying nearby healthy ones.

Salvinia effect
The salvinia effect describes the stabilization of an air layer upon a submerged hydrophobic (water repellent) surface by hydrophilic (water-loving) pins. This physicochemical phenomenon was discovered on the floating fern Salvinia molesta by the botanist Wilhelm Barthlott (Universität Bonn) while working on the lotus effect and was described in cooperation with the physicist Thomas Schimmel (Karlsruher Institut für Technologie), fluid mechanist Alfred Leder (Universität Rostock) and their colleagues in 2010.

Control

Biological control
A tiny weevil, Cyrtobagous salviniae, found in the native distribution of S. molesta, is being studied as a biocontrol. C. salvinae was first used as a biological control in Australia at Lake Moondarra, a recreational lake in Mount Isa, Queensland in 1980. By mid-1981, the weevil had reduced the population to a few small patches. It ate the leaves of the weed, but preferred the buds. Its larvae ate the roots, rhizomes, and the buds. As the plant died, it turned brown and sank to the bottom of the waterway and decomposed. This weevil was used with success in other parts of the world (13 tropical countries) such as the Sepik River in Papua New Guinea, Sri Lanka; Lake Ossa in Cameroon as part of an AMMCO project to restore African manatee; Wappa Dam in Queensland, and lagoons (e.g. Kakadu National Park) in the Northern Territory, Australia. In Australia, the moth, Samea multiplicalis was also released in the hopes that it would reduce the size of the weed population. While this moth did become established in Australia and spread, it was not effective as a biological control. A third species, the grasshopper Paulinia acuminata, was considered, but not released in Australia. However, this grasshopper has been deliberately released for control of Salvinia molesta in parts of Africa, Sri Lanka and India, and accidentally in Puerto Rico.<ref>Perez-Gelabert, D.E. (2002). "Paulinia acuminata (Orthoptera: Pauliniidae) introduced to Puerto Rico, West Indies", Cocuyo' 12: 5.</ref> The giant gourami has long been known to prefer S. molesta and feed on it voraciously. It has been successfully used to control S. molesta in reservoirs of Sri Lanka.

Mechanical control
Plants are removed by machine or harvesting equipment and by hand; the latter is suitable only for small infestations. Harvesting equipment also can encounter difficulties, as it cannot remove all of the infestation, it cannot access shallow areas, and equipment can be inhibited by large masses of the plant. Once removed, the plant must be dried, burnt, or disposed of in a manner that ensures it will not re-enter the waterway. Other methods to control the aquatic weed are dredging and chaining.

Chemical control
Chemical control on S. molesta is difficult as it does have some resistance to herbicides. The chemical fluridon has been successfully used, but it requires prolonged contact and is not effective if it is suddenly diluted by rainwater or any other influx of water. Other chemicals, such as hexazinone and diquat and double-chelated copper are used together to kill S. molesta.

Prevention
Bans on the spreading, selling, relocation, and transportation of S. molesta may help in the prevention of further spreading.

In Caddo Lake, efforts to eradicate S. molesta have included the farming and introduction of salvinia weevils which eat the plant. They are used as a method of biological pest control which from anecdotal evidence show a positive yet slow success rate.

Mapping
Satellite images are used to identify S. molesta in reservoirs in Texas.

 Chemistry 
The phenolic compounds 6'-O-(3,4-dihydroxy benzoyl)-beta-D-glucopyranosyl ester, 4-O-beta-d-glucopyranoside-3-hydroxy methyl benzoate, methyl benzoate, hypogallic acid, caffeic acid, paeoniflorin and pikuroside can be isolated from Salvinia molesta.

References

Bibliography
  

External links
GRIN-Global Web v 1.9.7.1: Taxonomy profile of Salvinia molesta
USDA Plants Profile for Salvinia molesta (kariba-weed)
Salvinia molesta information from the Hawaiian Ecosystems at Risk project (HEAR)
US Geological Survey: Giant Salvinia
Texas campaign to prevent spread: Hello Giant Salvinia, Goodbye Texas Lakes
United States National Agricultural Library, National Invasive Species Information Center" Species profile for Giant Salvinia (Salvinia molesta) – general information and control resources.''

Salviniales
Aquatic plants
Flora of South America
Ferns of Brazil
Ferns of the Americas
Invasive plant species in Sri Lanka